Kim Seo-hyeon (born December 10, 1993), known professionally as KATIE, is a South Korean-born American singer who finished first in K-pop Star 4. Her breakthrough performance of "Where You Need To Be" reached 4 million views on South Korea's leading video-sharing site, Naver TV Cast, in the shortest amount of time in K-pop Star history. After winning the show, she decided to sign with YG Entertainment.

In May 2018, Katie joined AXIS, a new company founded by former YG creative director SINXITY. With a change of label, YG Entertainment would continue to help with the distribution of her debut album. Her debut extended play, Log, was released on May 22, 2019.

Early life
Kim Seo-hyeon was born on December 10, 1993 in Bucheon. She immigrated to New Jersey at the age of 10. Her mother would play classical music when she was a child, and she realized that she wanted to be a singer in her high school years. She studied jazz at the Berklee College of Music, but had to drop out due to financial difficulties burdening her family.

Career 
Katie applied for K-pop Star 4 to further her career back in South Korea. She emerged as the winner for the season, and she opted to sign with YG Entertainment, and she became a trainee under the agency. After winning she performed live for the first time with hip-hop duo, Jinusean, with their latest hit, "Tell Me One More Time", which she performed at SBS Inkigayo. She spent three years under YG, where she recorded several songs and produced music videos, and YG noticed her preference for American music. She also visited the United States to participate in songwriting camps, where she wrote most of her songs for her album. Despite this, development for her solo album stagnated and was repeatedly delayed.

Producer SJ "SINXITY" Shin, who oversaw Katie's album, eventually left YG to create his own label, AXIS, which complicated the schedule of her debut. SINXITY wanted Katie to join AXIS, and after consulting with YG founder Yang Hyun-suk, she decided to leave YG to join AXIS in May 2018, with YG Plus continuing to distribute her album. She became the label's first artist, and she gained more creative control with her music under AXIS.

She debuted with the single "Remember" from her debut extended play, Log, on June 6, 2018. The music video was uploaded on YG's official YouTube channel, and has since received over 10 million views on the platform. A second single was supposed to be released on August 8, with the release of Log by October 10. The positive reception to the song resulted in her delaying her EP due to newfound interest from record labels, and she ultimately partnered with AWAL for distribution. She released a Spotify Singles EP in October 2018, which included live versions of "Remember" and a cover of India Arie's "Beautiful Surprise".

She moved to Los Angeles in April 2019. "Remember" was re-released on April 17, with Ty Dolla Sign as a featured artist; her manager previously managed Ty Dolla Sign, and he contacted him for the collaboration. She released her second single, "Thinkin Bout You", on May 21, with Log releasing a day later.

Katie performed at the Seoul Jazz Festival on May 25.

Artistry
Kim's primary influences include jazz, soul, funk, and R&B musicians such as Aaliyah, Frank Sinatra, Lalah Hathaway, Nao, D'Angelo, Erykah Badu, H.E.R., Ella Fitzgerald, Chet Baker, and Frank Ocean, most of which she listened to as a student in Berklee.

Discography

Extended play

Singles

As featured artist

Other charted songs

Music Video

Awards and nominations

References

External links
 
 Katie Kim's videography on YouTube
 Official Fan Cafe (Katie Is Love)

K-pop singers
South Korean soul singers
South Korean jazz singers
South Korean contemporary R&B singers
South Korean female idols
South Korean women pop singers
English-language singers from South Korea
Berklee College of Music alumni
YG Entertainment artists
K-pop Star winners
1993 births
Living people
21st-century South Korean singers
People from Bucheon
21st-century South Korean women singers